The Maytrees is American author Annie Dillard's second novel, a fictional account of the lives of Toby and Lou Maytree in Provincetown, MA, from the time of courting to old age.

Plot introduction
Literate Provincetown bohemians Toby and Lou Maytree meet and marry, have a son, and begin to grow old before Toby decides to leave for Maine to build a new life with a family friend. Toby and Lou remain estranged as the book follows both characters through life's progress: Lou raises their son and Toby and Deary develop a successful business. When Deary falls ill and Toby loses his ability to care for her, the families are reunited.

References

External links
 NPR: Excerpt: The Maytrees, read by Annie Dillard
 New York Times review of The Maytrees
 Slate review of The Maytrees
 Open Letters review of 'The Maytrees''

2007 American novels
Novels set in Massachusetts
Provincetown, Massachusetts
HarperCollins books